is a Japanese sailor. He competed in the 49er event at the 2008 Summer Olympics and finished in 12th position.

References

External links
 
 

1973 births
Living people
Japanese male sailors (sport)
Olympic sailors of Japan
Sailors at the 2008 Summer Olympics – 49er
Sportspeople from Fukuoka Prefecture